Enola Holmes (Music from the Netflix Film) is the soundtrack of the 2020 film of the same name, directed by Harry Bradbeer, starring Millie Bobby Brown as the titular character. Daniel Pemberton composed the musical score, which he described it as a "blend of melodic and emotional orchestral music coupled with a nice level of messy quirky oddness thrown". The score was released on September 23, 2020 by Milan Records, the same day as the film. A vinyl edition of the soundtrack was later released on June 4, 2021. The score received positive response from critics, praising Pemberton's composition.

Development 
In July 2019, Daniel Pemberton was announced as composer of the film's score. Having previously worked with the director Harry Bradbeer on television shows, Pemberton discussed with him, to create a "score full of themes, mystery and surprise that both encapsulated her character but also taking audiences on her journey". He thought Enola Holmes was very different from a typical Sherlock Holmes character and liked what he did, but felt that he could bring a bit of his own personality, which was a major concern, as multiple composers were worked in several media adaptations based on the character — most notably Hans Zimmer and Lorne Balfe's score for Guy Ritchie's film adaptation series, David Arnold and Michael Price's score for the subsequent television series and Bruce Broughton's score for Young Sherlock Holmes (1985). Pemberton called the score as "quite a conventional straight orchestral score" which is different from what he usually scores, and attributed it as it "got the sort of magic of Harry Potter in a way".

Bradbeer was keen on having very strong themes, as according to Pemberton, "often you don't get someone actually asking for themes. Lots of directors sort of say they want themes but they actually don’t - as soon as they get big strong melodies they start to get a bit scared. Whereas Harry really did want themes. I played around with a few ideas, but we hadn't really nailed them yet." He then recorded those themes at his house during Christmas of 2019; Pemberton used his old piano and had recorded a bunch of tunes in his IPhone before sending it to Bradbeer, who later responded positively agreeing to work with the film. He then turned those pre-recorded material into score cues, which worked really well. These tracks were converted into three main themes: a theme for Enola, Tewkesbury and what Pemberton called it as "the mystery adventure theme". He also added multiple variations of the themes will be featured throughout the film. 

For Enola's theme, he used an oboe as the foremost instrument as Pemberton "wanted to do something that had an energetic drive to it but that felt a bit more wonky and eccentric. Enola as a character is quite tactile and rough. She's not poised or necessarily elegant in the way people normally perceive that ideal". Hence he wanted a sound that is "rough and tumble", and adding that "the more bangy piano sound was a really good way to get that rhythm going. Then I wanted something that floated on top of that – that captured another side to her – but I also wanted something that was a solo instrument. Her name is Enola which is ‘alone’ backwards, so I wanted something that very much captured just one individual. And the oboe just seemed to work really well, and it doesn’t get used that much. It's a really beautiful sound, and it also feels very British to me. So it felt like a good way to introduce her and the world and start the film." 

Pemberton added that in Enola Holmes, the over-the-top scoring where emotional moments synchronised well with the film as with orchestral scores " there are zillions of very good sample sets that allow you to write orchestral music, whereas most of my other projects… all the things I want to do, don't exist. So I have to make them or build them or find a way around [...] there's already a lot of great orchestral music in the world, so I'm always trying to do something different. But with this, it felt like that was the most right thing for the film, and so it was really fun for me just to really concentrate more on melody and big emotion." He also recorded a squeaky door-slamming score in Airbnb, while he was holidaying at Greece.

Track listing

Reception 
The music received critical acclaim. Jonathan Broxton wrote "every single part of Enola Holmes is just superb. The three main themes are memorable in their own way, and the way that Pemberton constantly finds new ways to adapt them, arrange them, change the instrumentation, and find new emotional messages, is very impressive. The depth and intricacy of the orchestrations means that the score is never dull; there’s always a new sound combination, or a new texture, just around the corner. Fans of the quintessentially ‘English’ sound in film music will find it in abundance here, and those who were also drawn to Hans Zimmer and David Arnold’s respective musical interpretations of the Holmes legacy will also find that a lot of this score occasionally treads similar paths." James Southall of Movie Wave wrote "Enola Holmes is a delightful score – it’s conventional by recent Pemberton standards but still features a number of quirks and it feels so continually fresh and energetic" and concluded it as "one of the year’s strongest scores and an album which will reward repeated listens".

Filmtracks.com wrote "Enola Holmes is a mixture of incredibly inventive, engaging, and enthusiastic attitude and insanely disjointed instrumental quirkiness. When this score excels, it enthralls you, breaks your heart, and piques your intellectual interest. When it tries your patience, it's usually doing so as Pemberton tries to be too cute with one of his endless crescendos of pomposity or gets sidetracked by the darker passages. When you evaluate these two tendencies of the score together, however, the positives far outweigh the negatives. On album, the presentation may benefit from abandoning any attempt to program a chronological narrative organization and instead place the Enola theme's portions together in one group, the love theme and mother material in another, and the mystery theme's boisterous variants in one more. The score has outstanding cues throughout but needs some care when admiring its explosively wild ride outside of the film."

Film Music Central wrote "This soundtrack is, without a doubt, an incredible adventure to listen to". Mfiles wrote "You could describe the score as very much like the film's central character: relatable and a little bit eccentric. It has action, drama, mystery, adventure, and jeopardy but also some character development and emotion. It is full of good tunes and propulsive rhythms, with interesting and sometimes surprising instrumentation. While I wouldn't expect the score to be a serious oscar-contender, it is a hugely entertaining listen which further extends Pemberton's range." Marvelous Geeks Media writer Jenna Anne stated "Enola Holmes’ original score, even without the context of the film is simply magical, adventurous, and so surprisingly comforting even amidst the more upbeat tracks."

Personnel 
Credits adapted from CD liner notes.

 Daniel Pemberton – composer, producer
 Gareth Griffiths – score contractor
 Ben Smithers – score editor
 Andrew Skeet – orchestrator, orchestra conductor
 Edward Farmer – additional orchestration
 Nathan Klein – additional orchestration
 Gianluca Massimo – assistant engineer
 Jack Mills – assistant engineer
 Jack Thomason – assistant engineer
 Chris Parker – pro-tools operator
 John Prestage – pro-tools operator
 Alex Wharton – mastering
 Sam OKell – recording, mixing
 Alison Litton – music supervision
 Peter Afterman – music supervision
 JC Chamboredon – executive producer
 Stefan Karrer – executive producer

Chart performance

References 

2020 soundtrack albums
Milan Records soundtracks
Works based on Sherlock Holmes